Kedgwick may refer to:

 Kedgwick, New Brunswick, a rural community in Restigouche County, New Brunswick
 Kedgwick River, a body of water in New Brunswick